1995 Czech Lion Awards ceremony was held on 2 March 1996.

Winners and nominees

Non-statutory Awards

References

1995 film awards
Czech Lion Awards ceremonies